Motihari Court railway station is a halt railway station on Muzaffarpur–Gorakhpur main line under the Samastipur railway division of East Central Railway zone. This is situated at Gandak Colony, Lauthaha, Motihari in East Champaran district of the Indian state of Bihar.

References

Railway stations in East Champaran district
Samastipur railway division